The Uryung-Ulakh or  Yuryung-Ulakh ( or Юрюнг-Уулаах; , Ürün Uulaax) is a river in the Sakha Republic (Yakutia), Russia.

The river flows north of the Arctic Circle, across territories of the East Siberian Lowland in Allaikhovsky District marked by permafrost. There are no settlements along its course.

Course
The Uryung-Ulakh is the main tributary of the Khroma. It has its sources in the lake of the same name, a fairly large lake of the southeastern part of the Yana-Indigirka Lowland located to the south of the Muksunuokha basin. The river heads first roughly southeastwards across a tundra area of swamps and numerous small lakes. After a long stretch it bends and meanders in an northeastern direction until it meets the  western shore of lake Usun-Ulakh-Tubata (Усун-Уулаах-Тубата), south of the mouth of the Kyuyol-Yuryakh in the same lake. The Uryung-Ulakh then flows out of the lake from the northeastern shore, meandering strongly eastwards, joining the left bank of the Khroma  from its mouth in the Khroma Bay of the East Siberian Sea.

Tributaries  
There are over 1,600 lakes in its basin. The river is frozen between late September and mid June.

Fauna
The Uryung-Ulakh is one of the sites providing a breeding place for the Siberian crane, a critically endangered species.

See also
List of rivers of Russia

References

External links 
Fishing & Tourism in Yakutia

Drainage basins of the East Siberian Sea
Rivers of the Sakha Republic
East Siberian Lowland